Marcado Creek is a  stream in Victoria County, Texas, in the United States. It is a tributary of Garcitas Creek.

Marcado is a name derived from Spanish meaning "branded".

See also
List of rivers of Texas

References

Rivers of Victoria County, Texas
Rivers of Texas